Squaresville is an American comedy web series created by Matt Enlow. The series follows best friends Esther (Kylie Sparks) and Zelda (Mary Kate Wiles) as they deal with life in their suburban town, one adventure at a time. It premiered on YouTube on March 16, 2012.

The series was financed by a Kickstarter campaign that successfully raised $12,000 from 196 backers to complete production of its first season.

In 2012, Squaresville joined the Big Frame YouTube network. On February 1, 2013, Squaresville launched its second season.

Cast

Mary Kate Wiles as Zelda Waring
Kylie Sparks as Esther
Austin Rogers as Percy
Tiffany Ariany as Shelly
David Ryan Speer as Wayne
Christine Weatherup as Sarah Waring

Awards and nominations

Won
 2013 IAWTV
 Best Comedy Web Series
 Best Ensemble Performance
 Best Writing (Comedy): Matt Enlow

Nominated
 2013 IAWTV
 Best Directing (Comedy): Matt Enlow
 Best Female Performance (Comedy): Mary Kate Wiles
 Best Female Performance (Comedy): Kylie Sparks

References

External links
 
 
 

2012 web series debuts
American comedy web series
Kickstarter-funded web series
YouTube original programming